Rincón de Olivedo is a village in the municipality of Cervera del Río Alhama, in the province and autonomous community of La Rioja, Spain. As of 2018 had a population of 546 people.

References

Populated places in La Rioja (Spain)